The Manua District is one of the three primary administrative divisions of American Samoa. The district comprises the Manua Islands, which are located approximately 61 miles east of the main island, Tutuila. The Manua District is considered to be a county-equivalent by the U.S. Census Bureau.

In 2010, the Manua District had a per capita income of $5,441 — this makes the Manua District the county / county-equivalent with the lowest-per capita income in the entire United States.

District divisions
Manu'a District is further divided into five counties.
Faleasao County
Fitiuta County
Ofu County
Olosega County
Taʻū County

Demographics

Manu'a District was first recorded beginning with the 1900 U.S. Census. No census was taken in 1910, but a special census was taken in 1912. Regular decennial censuses were taken beginning in 1920. Its population zenith was in 1950. As of 2000–10, it had a population lower than when first recorded in 1900.

See also
Eastern District, American Samoa
Western District, American Samoa

References

 American Samoa, its districts and unorganized islands; United States Census Bureau

Districts of American Samoa